I Don't Know A Thing About Love: The Songs of Harlan Howard is the 73rd solo studio album by Willie Nelson, released on March 3, 2023. Produced by Buddy Cannon, the album is a tribute to the songwriter Harlan Howard.

Content
The album is a collection of ten songs performed by Nelson and originally written by Harlan Howard. Howard gave Nelson his first job as a songwriter for the publishing company Pamper Music. The album was produced by Buddy Cannon, and it will feature cover art drawn by Nelson's son, Micah.

The album was released on March 3, 2023, the 21st anniversary of Howard's death. On January 17, 2023, Nelson released the single "Busted".

Critical reception

Stephen Thomas Erlewine at AllMusic praised Nelson's voice and said that while the arrangements of Howard's songs held few surprises, this put the focus on the "ace band", resulting in a record which sounds "easy and relaxed, familiar and fresh" while No Depression concluded that "even when the songs are coming out of his mouth instead of his head, Nelson still delivers the goods like nobody’s business but his own." Liz Thomson of The Arts Desk called the album "a real doozy, an album with which it’s impossible not to fall in love," praising Howard's "irresistible" songs, the musicianship and Nelson's "remarkably secure" voice.

Track listing

Personnel

Performance
Wyatt Beard – background vocals
Melonie Cannon – background vocals
Jim "Moose" Brown – piano, synthesizer, B-3 organ, Wurlitzer
Mike Johnson – steel guitar
James Mitchell – electric guitar
Willie Nelson – lead vocals, Trigger
Larry Paxton – bass, tic tac bass
Mickey Raphael – harmonica
Bobby Terry – acoustic guitar, electric guitar
Lonnie Wilson – drums

Production
Buddy Cannon – production
Tony Castle – recording, mixing
Steve Chadie – recording
Shannon Finnegan – production coordinator
Andrew Mendelson – mastering

Other personnel
Micah Nelson – artwork

Charts

References

Willie Nelson albums
2023 albums
Albums produced by Buddy Cannon
Legacy Recordings albums
Tribute albums